Honeywell Aerospace (formerly COM DEV International) is a satellite technology, space sciences, and telecommunications company based in Cambridge, Ontario, Canada. The company has branches and offices in Ottawa, the United States, the United Kingdom, China and India.

The company develops and manufactures specialized satellite systems, including microwave systems, switches, optical systems, specialized satellite antennas, as well as components for the aviation and aerospace industry. The company produces custom equipment designs for commercial, military and civilian purposes, as well as providing contract research for the space sciences.

History 

COM DEV International was founded in 1974 and specialized in microwave technology for the aviation and aerospace industry. The company would go on to become a leader in space satellite componentry and hardware, specializing in telecommunication systems; a global designer and builder of telecommunication components and systems for space satellites; as well as one of Canada's largest sources of spacecraft instrumentation.

In 2001, its space products division opened an approximate $7-million Surface Acoustic Wave (SAW) development and manufacturing laboratory in its Cambridge facility.

In 2005, it purchased the EMS Technologies Space Science optical division in Ottawa, formerly CAL Corporation, from MacDonald, Dettwiler and Associates for $5 million.

In 2007, it purchased a Passive Microwave division in El Segundo, California, for $8.75 million. In 2010 it purchased Ottawa-based space instrument supplier Routes AstroEngineering for $1.7 million. Later that year, it established a subsidiary called exactEarth offering global ship tracking data services. In 2015, it purchased MESL Microwave of Edinburgh, Scotland. Also that year, it entered the waveguide market with the purchase of Pacific Wave Systems (PWS) of Garden Grove, California.

On November 15, 2015, Honeywell announced that it would acquire COM DEV, which would become part of Honeywell's Defense and Space business. On February 4, 2016, Honeywell announced that it had completed the acquisition, and COM DEV has since been renamed Honeywell Aerospace.

Products 

Since the 1990s the company has manufactured components for satellites including:
 Telemetry communication and control modules
 Multiplexer (MUX) switching networks and filters
 Crossovers for microwave
 Modulators, regulators
 Surface acoustic wave filters
 Assemblies for airline telecommunications
 Special satellite antennas

Projects 

The company has developed and built satellites assemblies or components for over 900 satellite missions, including:
 Sapphire (satellite) Optical Imaging Payload
 Swarm (spacecraft) Canadian Electric Field Instrument
 ExactView 1
 Terra (Satellite) MOPITT Instrument
 CASSIOPE e-POP Radio Receiver Instrument
 Dextre Force Moment Sensors
 Upper Atmosphere Research Satellite WINDII Instrument
 Far Ultraviolet Spectroscopic Explorer Fine Error Sensor
 SCISAT-1 MAESTRO instrument and CALTRAC Startracker
 Odin (Satellite) Odin-OSIRIS Instrument
 Herschel Space Observatory HIFI Local oscillator Source Unit
 Jason-1 CALTRAC Startrackers
 Genesis (spacecraft) CALTRAC Startrackers
 Formosat-2 CALTRAC Startrackers
 Nozomi (spacecraft) Thermal Plasma Analyser
 Akebono (satellite) Suprathermal ion Mass Spectrometer
 Freja (satellite) Cold Gas Analyser and Auroral Imager
 Interbol Ultraviolet Auroral Imager
 Viking (satellite) Ultraviolet Imager
 CloudSat
 Meteosat

Upcoming missions include:
 Maritime Monitoring and Messaging Micro-Satellite (M3MSat)
 James Webb Space Telescope (JWST) Fine Guidance Sensor and Near Infrared Imaging and Slitless Spectrograph

Past projects have also included an Automatic Identification System (AIS) validation nanosatellite launched on an Antrix PSLV-C9 vehicle from the Satish Dhawan Space Centre in Sriharikota, India in April 2008. The AIS experimental spacecraft was built under contract by the University of Toronto Institute for Aerospace Studies (UTIAS) Space Flight Laboratory (SFL), which also designated with the responsibility for its operation.

Research and development 

The company provides research and development work in aeronautics and space technology. Many modules of the company are used in many well-known space probes and satellites. The company cooperates with major space agencies, including NASA, the European Space Agency (ESA), JAXA, Indian Space Research Organisation and the Canadian Space Agency (CSA).

See also

 Boeing Canada
 Bombardier Aerospace
 Canadian Space Agency
 CMC Electronics
 Héroux-Devtek
 MacDonald, Dettwiler and Associates
 Spar Aerospace
 Viking Air

References 

 Citations 

 Bibliography 

 Com Dev - Corporate
 Com Dev - Financial Results 2012, accessed on 12 November 2013 (PDF, 2.3 MB)
 Com Dev Fine Guidance Sensor for the James Webb Space Telescope, accessed on November 12, 2013

External links 

  Com DEV - Corporate Website (English)
 Satellite Industry Association

Honeywell
Manufacturer
Aerospace companies of Canada
Manufacturer
Spacecraft component manufacturers
Telecommunications equipment vendors
Manufacturing companies of Canada
Companies based in Cambridge, Ontario
Manufacturing companies based in Ontario
Technology companies established in 1974
Space industry companies of Canada
1974 establishments in Ontario
Canadian companies established in 1974